Phyllolepis (from the Greek roots for ‘leaf’ and ‘scale’) is the type genus of Phyllolepida, an extinct taxon of arthrodire placoderm fish from the middle to late Devonian. The species of Phyllolepis, themselves, are restricted to the Famennian-aged freshwater strata of the Late Devonian, around 360 million years ago. Fossils of this genus have been found primarily in Europe and North America. The end of the Devonian saw them disappear in a mass extinction.

Phyllolepis lived in freshwater environments, possibly rivers and streams. As with all other known phyllolepids, Phyllolepis were presumed to have been blind, bottom-dwelling predators that detected prey through sensory organs in the surface grooves of their armor plates (which gave their plates a distinctive "wooden surface" appearance).

Description and paleobiology 
Phyllolepis, as was typical of Phyllolepida, tended to be 30 to 40 cm in length and very flat. Phyllolepis have extensive armor made of full, flat plates, rather than scales, with both a wide jaw and mouth. They are characterized by a broad, enlarged nuchal plate paired with four small plates around the upper jaw. They have short and broad anterior ventrolateral plates, as well as paranuchal plates with postnuchal process. They also feature long, narrow anterior dorsolateral plates and a dermal ornamentation of smooth, concentric rings upon their plates.

As a placoderm, Phyllolepis was a primitive jawed fish, with their jaws likely having been evolved from the first set of their gill arches. Elongated basiptergia have been found on some phyllolepid placoderms, such as Austrophyllolepis and Cowralepis, suggesting Phyllolepis may have had them as well.

As with other members of Phyllolepida, Phyllolepis have eyes on either side of their heads, unlike modern flounders, as well as an absent sclerotic ring. This suggests that the eyes of Phyllolepis may have been much reduced, vestigial, or completely absent. The pattern of raised ridges on its head and trunk plates are a defining trait, setting them apart from other placoderms. The highly developed system of lateral ridges are suggested to have been used for electroreception, in order to sense their surroundings in absence of functional eyes.

Synapomorphies of Phyllolepis include the sub triangular dermal portion of the marginal plate. This genus can be distinguished from Cowralepis because of their deeply concave anterior margin, where it meets the postorbital plate, as well as the exit of the main lateral line canal in the middle of the plate (rather than in its posterior third division). Cowralepis also features a distinct posterior dorsolateral plate, which Phyllolepis lack entirely.

However, because many defining traits for Phyllolepis must be used in conjunction with other traits (for example, the genera Phyllolepis, Placolepis, and Cobandrahlepis all lack a posterior median ventral plate), it is difficult to identify phyllolepid placoderms unless a full fossil assemblage is known. Due to the isolated phyllolepid plates found for species such as P. concentrica, konicki, undulata, and delicatula, it has been suggested by J. Long and E. Daeschler that they be recategorized as Phyllolepidae gen. et sp. Indeterminate. P. woodwardi, orvini, neilseni, and rossimontina are all species with complete and valid sets of plates.

Ecology 
These fishes were likely ambush predators, lying in wait in the substrate as bottom-dwellers. Their long tails would be used for rapid propulsion to catch their prey. This is typical of many flattened placoderms.

One of the sites where various Phyllolepis specimens have been discovered, Red Hill in Clinton County, Pennsylvania, shows signs of having been a freshwater subhabitat, similar to current Midwestern lakes. However, dig sites in Europe- and even locations still in the Pennsylvania Catskill formation- may have been home to coastal-marine Phyllolepis species, based on the composition of siltstones and sediment deposits. At least one phyllolepid specimen has been found surrounded by plant material and greenish siltstones, suggesting a low energy environment, such as a floodplain pond. This divide raises some questions about how the genus lived in both places. It is possible there were land connections intercontinentally, or the fishes were euryhaline or marine-tolerant. The fish may have even evolved a freshwater habit after arriving in North America by marine waterways.

All of the phyllolepids found in the Northern Hemisphere have been found in rock dated to the later Devonian Period (Famennian), however Australian and Antarctic samples date earlier, from the late middle Devonian up through the late Famennian. The oldest confirmed Phyllolepid is from the middle Devonian. The genus Phyllolepis has so far only been found in Famennian age strata.

Species

History of categorization 
Phyllolepis was the first genus to be recognized in the order Phyllolepidae until 1984. Phyllolepis concentrica was the first species discovered of the genus, by Louis Agassiz in 1844 at Clashbennie, Scotland. This specimen caused Woodward to incorrectly classify them as a distinct group belonging to the jawless fishes in 1915, along with Drepanaspidae. Sensiö continued, with several publications in the 1930s, to show that phyllolepids had jaws, and belonged with placoderms. He also proclaimed them part of Phyllolepida, based on his studies of P. orvini, P. soederberghi, and P. neilseni.

From the 1930s to 50s, there were several isolated dermal plates of phyllolepids found in Australia, attributed by Hills to be Phyllolepis but specific species left undefined. In the 1970s many complete, articulated Phyllolepid specimens were found from the middle Devonian at the Mt. Howitt site in Australia. This material was gradually defined as genus Austrophyllolepis, based on plate proportions, but also solidified the assignment of the group to Placodermi and as a clade inside Arthrodira.

The more recent introduction of P. rossimontina as a species in 2005 demonstrated, in part, a wide range of variability within the genus Phyllolepis, causing some scientists to begin a revision of the genus.

The low number of complete Phyllolepis specimens found combined with key identifying features only visible on specific plates has made it difficult to confidently identify species, causing some paleontologists to call for redesignations of the current named species of Phyllolepis.

References  

 Wildlife of Gondwana: Dinosaurs and Other Vertebrates from the Ancient Supercontinent (Life of the Past) by Pat Vickers Rich, Thomas Hewitt Rich, Francesco Coffa, and Steven Morton
 The Rise of Fishes: 500 Million Years of Evolution by John A. Long

External links
 Phyllolepida at Palaeos.com

Phyllolepids
Placoderms of Europe
Placoderms of North America
Fossil taxa described in 1844
Famennian life
Famennian genus first appearances
Famennian genus extinctions